Burn-Up W is a 1996 anime OVA directed by Hiroshi Negishi. It was soon followed by a series version called Burn-Up Excess, though it occasionally lacks continuity with the series. The OVA consists of four episodes, chronicling Team Warrior through more missions. Like the original series, there is still a large amount of fan service.

Plot
Burn Up W is about the adventures of Team Warrior, a band of highly skilled and completely reckless female cops. The team features the loose cannon Rio, trigger-happy Maya and ace hacker Lilica, who get the job done, regardless of the cost to the Tokyo Police Department or the city.

Main characters
 Rio Kinezono (利緒)
 Rio is Team Warrior's "Pointman" on many missions. She's blonde, very buxom, and rather ditzy, and she can't seem to keep money in her wallet. Along with that, she is always looking for a wealthy Mr. Right so she can ditch her job as a civil servant.

 In Burn Up W, it is unknown why or how she joins Warrior. Unlike Maya, Rio is more skilled in hand-to-hand combat, but is known to use a firearm now and again (for example during the "Skin Dive" and "Policetown Assault" episodes). Although she won't admit it, she noticeably has some feeling towards her partner Yuji Naruo, but since the W OVA is only 4 episodes it was never expanded on.

 

 Maya Jingu (真弥)
 Team Warrior's green haired gun-toting maniac. Maya is about the same height as Rio with relatively the same body measurements. She is Team Warrior's primary sniper and gun user. She mainly joined to shoot as much as she wanted, which causes problems because she doesn't get to shoot that much, which in many cases leads her to feeling something akin to sexual frustration. To her, the bigger the gun the better; no matter whatever gun she uses she'll find some satisfaction (sexual or otherwise). Many times Maya is overheard saying that if she doesn't get to shoot more, she'll quit the police and become a mercenary.

 Maya is mostly paired up with Rio on missions and covers her back on most occasions.

 

 Lilica Ebett (リリカ)
 Lilica is the tech expert on the team. She has pink hair and is the shortest of all the Burn Up W characters. Lilica is the daughter of a very wealthy businessman, but it is unknown in the OVA who he is or why Lilica is working at Policetown anyway if she has so much money. To highlight the wealth of her father, at one point she refuses a space satellite as a birthday gift from her father.

 Lilica is never out in the field with Rio and Maya, instead she is at the Warrior computer with Maki as support.

 

 Nanvel Candlestick (ナンベル)
 Nanvel is the resident engineer on Team Warrior. During the Vitural Idol case, Maki enlisted the aid of Nanvel who has developed the "El Heggunte" android hunter robot (which bears a striking resemblance to Unit 01 of Evangelion fame).

 Nanvel is a genius when it comes to robotics and cyber technology, but due to her department being totally underfunded, she is stuck in the Policetown hangar bay way below the base. Through some of Maki's connections, Nanvel's department receives more funding and we begin to see her more in the OVA.

 Similar to the way Maya has a gun fetish, Nanvel becomes hot and heavy about mechanical things and robots. In the last episode of the OVA, she equips Rio with a new force knuckle and Maya with a new anti-tank shotgun.
 

 Maki Kawasaki (マキ)
 Maki is the team leader of the Warrior strike force. She is tough as nails and at times can be quite manipulative when it comes to conning her superiors into giving her team more leeway in some missions. This same social cunning is employed on Rio often, to ensure that the hot-headed blonde performs as needed during missions.

 Maki acts like a mother figure to the Warrior team, guiding them and giving them focus, but she seems to have more of a connection to Rio than anyone else on the team. It is rumored that the Maki of Burn-Up W is the same Maki from the original Burn-Up! OVA back in the 90's and that Rio is acting very similarly to how the Burn-Up! of Maki used to act which almost gives their relationship a passing the torch feel. In W, Maki is never in the field with Rio and Maya.

 

 Yuji Naruo (ユージ)
 Yuji is the token pervert in the Burn up series. He is constantly looking up girls' skirts or going into porn stores. But for all his faults he is still very lovable, he loves Rio a lot and at times will rush into danger to save her, but will wind up getting caught himself forcing Rio to save him.

 In W, Yuji is a pervert but he has his redeeming qualities. His W version seems to only be interested in Rio and porn, because he never makes an advance at Maya or Nanvel (even though Nanvel dresses way less than Rio and Maya). Although he takes a mostly inactive role, he is still considered a member of Warrior and pilots the helicopter and other vehicles for special Warrior missions.

 Voiced by: Ryotaro Okiayu (Japanese), Jason Lee (English)

 Miss Ruby

 Miss Ruby is the mysterious woman who works in Falcon Claw. She takes the hotel and its patrons hostage. She seems to always wear a pair of shades too and her hair is lavender colored and comes down to her shoulders (Red when wearing a wig). Ruby is also quite skilled with handling machines. She is only referred to as "Chief Terrorist".

Episodes

See also
 Burn-Up Scramble

External links
AIC page
ADV Films page

1996 anime OVAs
Action anime and manga
ADV Films
Anime International Company
Comedy anime and manga
Mecha anime and manga
Oh! great
Shōnen manga
Tokuma Shoten manga